Israel participated in the Eurovision Song Contest 2008 with the song "The Fire in Your Eyes" written by Dana International and Shay Kerem. The song was performed by Boaz Ma'uda, who was internally selected by the Israeli broadcaster Israel Broadcasting Authority (IBA) in collaboration with the commercial broadcaster Keshet in November 2007 to compete at the 2008 contest in Belgrade, Serbia, The song Ma'uda would perform at Eurovision was selected through the national final Kdam Eurovision 2008 which took place on 15 March 2010 that featured five songs. "Ke'ilu Kan" emerged as the winning song after achieving the highest score following the combination of votes from two regional juries, two thematical jury groups, a jury panel and a public vote. The song title was later translated from Hebrew to English for the Eurovision Song Contest and was titled "The Fire in Your Eyes".

Israel was drawn to compete in the first semi-final of the Eurovision Song Contest 2008. Performing during the show in position 2, "The Fire in Your Eyes" was announced among the top 10 entries of the second semi-final and therefore qualified to compete in the final. It was later revealed that Israel placed fifth out of the 19 participating countries in the semi-final with 104 points. In the final, Israel performed in position 7 and placed ninth out of the 25 participating countries, scoring 124 points.

Background 

Prior to the 2008 Contest, Israel had participated in the Eurovision Song Contest thirty times since its first entry in 1973. Israel has won the contest on three occasions: in 1978 with the song "A-Ba-Ni-Bi" performed by Izhar Cohen and the Alphabeta, in 1979 with the song "Hallelujah" performed by Milk and Honey and in 1998 with the song "Diva" performed by Dana International. Since the introduction of semi-finals to the format of the Eurovision Song Contest in 2004, Israel has, to this point, managed to qualify to the final two times, including a top ten result in 2005 with Shiri Maimon and "HaSheket SheNish'ar" placing fourth. Israel had qualified to the final for two consecutive years in 2005 and 2006 prior to their non-qualification in 2007 with the song "Push the Button" performed by the band Teapacks.

IBA confirmed Israel's participation in the contest on 4 July 2007 and formalised a collaboration with commercial broadcaster Keshet for the first time in order to select the Israeli entry for 2008 through the reality singing competition Kokhav Nolad. In 2007, IBA conducted an internal selection to select the artist that would represent Israel and a national final to select the song for the artist, a selection procedure that continued for their 2008 entry.

Before Eurovision

Artist selection 
On 14 November 2007, IBA announced that the winner of season five of the reality singing competition Kochav Nolad, Boaz Ma'uda, was selected as the Israeli representative for the Eurovision Song Contest 2008. IBA previously revealed in July 2007 that one of the participants of season five's Kokhav Nolad produced by Tedy Productions and Keshet Media Group would represent Israel at the contest. Together with the artist reveal, it was also announced that a national final titled Kdam Eurovision 2008 featuring five songs would take place to select his song.

Kdam Eurovision 2008 
IBA opened the public song submission following the announcement of Ma'uda as the selected artist with the deadline on 6 January 2008. IBA also directly invited composers to submit songs for the competition. 450 submissions were received at the close of the deadline, of which 350 were submitted by the public. Five songs were chosen for the competition by a professional committee with members from IBA and Keshet and announced on 23 January 2008. Among the competing composers was the winner of the Eurovision Song Contest 1998, Dana International. The members of the committee were Yoav Ginai (entertainment director of IBA), Haim Hador (radio presenter), Yaakov Naveh (IBA artists representative), Tamira Yardeni (Kochav Nolad producer), Yoav Tzafir (director of Kochav Nolad), Uri Selai (editor at Tedy Productions) and Tzedi Tzarfati (judging panel member of Kochav Nolad). Prior to the final, the songs were presented on 21 February 2008 during a special presentation programme broadcast online via IBA's official Eurovision Song Contest website Eurovil, hosted by Jason Danino-Holt.

Final 
The final took place over two days at the Ulpaneii TV Studios in Herzeliya, hosted by Tzvika Hadar and broadcast on Channel 2 as well as online via Eurovil and keshet-tv.com. During the first show on 25 February 2008, all five competing songs were performed by Boaz Ma'uda with two performed in a duet with other Israeli singers, and the public was able to vote for their favourite song through SMS until the second show 26 February 2008, during which the winning song, "Ke'ilu Kan", was selected by a combination of the votes from six voting groups: two regional juries (14%), two thematical jury groups (14%), an expert jury of IBA and Keshet representatives (36%) and the public vote (36%). In addition to the performances of the competing songs during the first show, 1973 Israeli Eurovision entrant Ilanit performed her song "Ey Sham" as the opening act, while the participants of season five's Kochav Nolad together with the winner of the Eurovision Song Contest 1978 Izhar Cohen performed as the interval act. A judging panel composed of Brotherhood of Man, Ralf Siegel, Carola Häggkvist, Moshe Datz (1991 Israeli Eurovision entrant), Nurit Hirsh, Kobi Oshrat, Michal Amdursky and Assaf Amdursky was also featured which provided feedback to the songs and selected "Ke'ilu Kan" as their favourite song.

Promotion 
On 17 April, Boaz Ma'uda performed during a concert which was organised by the Keren Hayesod organisation in Amsterdam, Netherlands to specifically promote "The Fire in Your Eyes" as the Israeli Eurovision entry.

At Eurovision

It was announced in September 2007 that the competition's format would be expanded to two semi-finals in 2008. According to the rules, all nations with the exceptions of the host country and the "Big Four" (France, Germany, Spain and the United Kingdom) are required to qualify from one of two semi-finals in order to compete for the final; the top nine songs from each semi-final as determined by televoting progress to the final, and a tenth was determined by back-up juries. The European Broadcasting Union (EBU) split up the competing countries into six different pots based on voting patterns from previous contests, with countries with favourable voting histories put into the same pot. On 28 January 2008, a special allocation draw was held which placed each country into one of the two semi-finals. Israel was placed into the first semi-final, to be held on 20 May 2008. The running order for the semi-finals was decided through another draw on 17 March 2008 and Israel was set to perform in position 2, following the entry from Montenegro and before the entry from Estonia.

In Israel, the two semi-finals and the final were televised live on IBA. The Israeli spokesperson, who announced the Israeli votes during the final, was Noa Barak-Weshler.

Semi-final 

Boaz Ma'uda took part in technical rehearsals on 11 and 15 May, followed by dress rehearsals on 19 and 20 May. The Israeli performance featured Boaz Ma'uda performing in a silver sleeveless shirt together with five male backing vocalists in black outfits. The performance began with the performers moving from behind the stage to the center part of the stage, with the backing vocalists later joining Ma'uda from the left side of the stage to the front stage. The stage was predominately blue and red with the LED screens displaying red elements. The five backing vocalists performing on stage with Boaz Ma'uda were Adam Yosef, Ariel Zohar, Eran Mazor Hecht, Lior Ashkenazi and Zach Eshel.

At the end of the show, Israel was announced as having finished in the top 10 and subsequently qualifying for the grand final. It was later revealed that Israel placed fifth in the semi-final, receiving a total of 104 points

Final 
Shortly after the first semi-final, a winners' press conference was held for the ten qualifying countries. As part of this press conference, the qualifying artists took part in a draw to determine the running order of the final. This draw was done in the order the countries appeared in the semi-final running order. Israel was drawn to perform in position 7, following the entry from Bosnia and Herzegovina and before the entry from Finland. Boaz Ma'uda once again took part in dress rehearsals on 23 and 24 May before the final. Israel placed ninth in the final, scoring 124 points.

Voting 
Below is a breakdown of points awarded to Israel and awarded by Israel in the first semi-final and grand final of the contest. The nation awarded its 12 points to Russia in the semi-final and the final of the contest.

Points awarded to Israel

Points awarded by Israel

References

2008
Countries in the Eurovision Song Contest 2008
Eurovision